Andrey Kuznetsov and Javier Martí won the title, defeating Emilio Benfele Álvarez and Adelchi Virgili 6–3, 6–3 in the final.

Seeds

Draw

Draw

References
 Main Draw

Doubles